Bayachevo is a village in Northern Bulgaria. The village is located in Targovishte Municipality, Targovishte Province. Аccording to the numbers provided by the 2020 Bulgarian census, Bayachevo currently has a population of 916 people with a permanent address registered in the settlement.

Geography 
Bayachevo village is located in Municipality Targovishte, 10 kilometers northeast away from Targovishte.

The village has an average elevation of 193 meters above sea level. The climate is continental. The total length of all streets within the village is 20 kilometers, making it one of the largest villages in Targovishte in terms of land area.

History 
Bayachevo's name stems from a story dating back to the 16th century. Bayach comes from the word “Baene” which in the Bulgarian language means curing diseases or curses. According to the legend, there used to be a person in the village who occupied such a position.

Infrastructure

Buildings 

 There is a kindergarten in the village.
 The local community center and library were founded in 1927.

Ethnicity 
According to the Bulgarian population census in 2011.

References 

Villages in Targovishte Province
Populated places established in the 16th century